Manyu Sukta is hymn 10.83 and 10.84 from the Rig veda. It contains 14 verses and is dedicated to Manyu. Manyu in Vedic sanskrit stands for temper, anger or passion. Devatas such as Varuna, Indra and  Rudra (Shiva) are mentioned in this sukta. Renowned Hindu Saint Madhvacharya quotes Manyu Sukta in the context of Bhima killing Dushasana in the Mahabharata war and said that Bhima invoked Lord Narasimha through this hymn after killing Dushasana. Vaishnava saint Dhirendra Tirtha wrote a commentary of Manyu Sukta in dedication to Lord Narasimha. Indian scholar V. R. Panchamukhi says, "The commentary Manyu Sūkta by Sri Dhirendratirtha interprets Manyu as Narasimha - who is the internal controller of Rudra and who is the embodiment of knowledge".

References 
Rig Veda Book X, Hymn 83

Hindu texts
Sanskrit texts
Rigveda
Vedic hymns